Hutteen Sporting Club is a Syrian professional football club based in Latakia, Syria. The club was founded in 1945. The club's greatest achievement was winning the Syrian Cup in 2001. The club colours are blue and white. Their home stadium, Al-Assad Stadium, has a capacity of 28,000 spectators. The club is currently playing in Syrian Premier League.

History 
It was founded in 1945 in the city of Latakia, although it sometimes plays at home in the capital Damascus. They have never won the Premier League title, their most important title being the  Syrian Cup won in 2001 after beating Al-Jaish SC 1-0 in the final in four finals they have played. 

At the international level they have participated in the AFC Cup Winners' Cup in 2001, in which they were eliminated in the second round by the Al-Shabab of Saudi Arabia  and in the 2001 Arab Club Champions Cup, where they were eliminated in the first round.

Grounds

Huteen, one of the most popular club in Latakia, plays his home matches with the Tishreen Club at Al-Assad Stadium. Their second stadium is sometimes Latakia Sports City Stadium.

Achievements
Syrian Premier League:
Runner-up: 1995–96, 1999–00
Syrian Cup: 1
Champion: 2000–2001
Runner-up: 1986–87, 1992–93, 1994–95, 1998–99, 2020–21

Performance in AFC competitions
 Asian Cup Winners Cup: 1 appearance
2000–01: Second Round

Records
Accurate as of 12 June 2022

Performance in UAFA competitions
 Arab Club Champions Cup: 1 appearance
2000–01: Group Stage

Records
Accurate as of 12 June 2022

Players

Current squad

Former coaches
  Leonida Nedelcu
  Dorian Marin

Basketball department

League positions 
Syrian Basketball League
Fifth place (1): 2015 (Group A)
Eighth place (1): 2004
Syrian Basketball Super Cup
Sixth place (1): 2021

References

External links
 Official site

Hutteen
Association football clubs established in 1945
Sport in Latakia
1945 establishments in Mandatory Syria